The Dancer of Sanssouci is a 1932 German historical drama film directed by Frederic Zelnik and starring Otto Gebühr, Lil Dagover, and Rosa Valetti. Set at the court of Frederick the Great, the film is part of a group of Prussian films made during the era. It portrays the interaction between Frederick and the celebrated dancer Barberina Campanini. Gebühr had previously appeared as Frederick in a silent film The Dancer Barberina about their relationship.

The film's sets were designed by the art director Leopold Blonder. It was shot at the Staaken Studios in Berlin. It premiered in the city at the Ufa-Palast am Zoo.

Cast
Otto Gebühr as Frederick II
Lil Dagover as Barberina Campanini
Rosa Valetti as mother
Hans Stüwe as Baron Cocceji
Hans Junkermann as Baron Pöllnitz
Hans Mierendorff as Old Dessauer
Paul Lipinski as General Ziethen
Bernhard Goetzke as General Seydlitz
Karl Platen as Fredersdorff
Hans Brausewetter as Möller
Margot Landa as Evchen
Paul Rehkopf as Gärtner, Evchen's father
Iris Arlan as Lady Brigelli
Philipp Manning as Johann Sebastian Bach
Carl de Vogt as Pesne
Paul Otto as Cagliostro
Hermann Böttcher as Count Kaunitz
Ernst Wurmser as Austrian General field marshal
Leo Monosson as singer

References

Bibliography

External links

1930s historical drama films
German historical drama films
Films of the Weimar Republic
Films directed by Frederic Zelnik
Prussian films
Films set in the 1740s
Films shot at Staaken Studios
Cultural depictions of Frederick the Great
Cultural depictions of Johann Sebastian Bach
German black-and-white films
1932 drama films
1930s German films
1930s German-language films